Grondin is a surname. Notable people with the surname include:

 Christophe Grondin (born 1983), naturalized Togolese football defender
 David Grondin (born 1980), French football player
 Gilles Grondin (1943–2005), Canadian politician
 Janvier Grondin (born 1947), Canadian politician
 Marc-André Grondin (born 1984), Canadian actor
 Pierre Grondin (1925–2006), Canadian cardiac surgeon
 Willy Grondin (born 1974), football goalkeeper
 Jean Grondin (born 1955), French-Canadian philosopher